Ampyzine is a central nervous system stimulant. It is a derivative of pyrazine.

References

External links

Stimulants
Aminopyrazines